The Welsh Open is a darts tournament organised by the World Darts Federation and affiliated with the British Darts Organisation which has been staged annually since 1974. In 2008 the tournament was televised in the United Kingdom for the first time on Setanta Sports as part of the BDO's new Grand Prix series. From 1987 the event has been staged at the Pontins holiday camp in Prestatyn, North Wales. The singles tournaments are sponsored by Red Dragon Sports and Pontins sponsor the other events.

List of tournaments

Men's

Women's

Boys

Girls

References

External links
List of previous winners Darts database

Darts in the United Kingdom
Darts tournaments
Sports competitions in Wales
British Darts Organisation tournaments
1974 establishments in Wales
Recurring sporting events established in 1974